Samuel Griswold Goodrich (August 19, 1793 – May 9, 1860), better known under his pseudonym Peter Parley, was an American author.

Biography

Goodrich was born at Ridgefield, Connecticut, the son of a Congregational minister. Goodrich was largely self-educated, and became an assistant in a country store at Danbury, Connecticut, which he left in 1808, and later again at Hartford, Connecticut, until 1811. From 1816 to 1822 he was a bookseller and publisher in Hartford. He visited Europe from 1823 to 1824, and moved to Boston in 1826. In 1833 he bought  in nearby Roxbury and built a home in what is now Jamaica Plain. There he continued in the publishing business, and from 1828 to 1842 published an illustrated annual, The Token, to which he was a frequent contributor both in prose and verse. A selection from these contributions was published in 1841 under the title Sketches from a Students Window. The Token also contained some of the earliest work of Nathaniel Hawthorne, Nathaniel Parker Willis, Henry Wadsworth Longfellow and Lydia Maria Child. In 1841 he established Merry's Museum, which he continued to edit till 1854.
Goodrich was associated with his brother Charles A. Goodrich in writing books for the young. His series, beginning in 1827 under the name of Peter Parley, embraced geography, biography, history, science and miscellaneous tales. Of these he was the sole author of only a few, but in 1857 he wrote that he was the author and editor of about 170 volumes, and that about seven millions had been sold. An English writer, George Mogridge, also used the name Peter Parley, raising objections from Goodrich, who had the prior claim.

In 1857 he published Recollections of a Lifetime, which contains a list both of the works of which he was the author or editor and of the spurious works published under his name. By his writings and publications he amassed a large fortune. He was active in Whig politics, and was elected a member of the Massachusetts House of Representatives in 1836, and of the state Senate in 1837, his competitor in the last election being Alexander Hill Everett, and in 1851-1853 he was consul at Paris, where he remained till 1855, taking advantage of his stay to have several of his works translated into French. At the end of his consulship, he was presented with a commemorative medal.

He returned to America and, in 1859, he published Illustrated Natural History of the Animal Kingdom. He died in New York and was buried in Southbury, Connecticut where he lived for a short time. His funeral was widely attended by a vast concourse of persons. Two hundred Sunday School children headed the procession to the cemetery.    The Archives and Special Collections at Amherst College holds a collection of his papers.

Legacy
Goodrich's land in Jamaica Plain was subdivided into residential streets, among them Peter Parley Road, Parley Avenue and Parley Vale.
There is a street called Peter Parley Row in Berlin, CT, presumably honoring the author's Connecticut birthplace.
There are two streets bearing his name in Ridgefield, CT, Parley Road and Parley Lane.
James Joyce mentions the name of Peter Parley in his novel A Portrait of the Artist as a Young Man at the end of chapter I.
 One room Schoolhouse in Ridgefield, CT, was named after Peter Parley.
 George du Maurier mentions "Peter Parleys Natural History" in his first novel "Peter Ibbetson" (Part One).
 Emily Dickinson mentions "Peter Parley" in one of her poems. ("Hurrah for Peter Parley!
Hurrah for Daniel Boone!
Three cheers, sir, for the gentleman
Who first observed the moon!")
 James Abbott McNeill Whistler refers dismissively to Peter Parley in his book The Gentle Art of Making Enemies.

References

Further reading
 Samuel Griswold Goodrich. Recollections of a Lifetime: or Men and Things I Have Seen. 1857. vol.1;  vol.2

External links 

 Samuel G. Goodrich Collection, Amherst College Archives and Special Collections
 
 
 
 
 Samuel Goodrich; alias Peter Parley - Jamaica Plain Historical Society article
Literary Activities Of Samuel G. Goodrich - Pat Pflieger
 The Young American: Or, Book of Government and Law; Showing Their History, Nature, and Necessity. For the Use of Schools, by S. G. Goodrich

1793 births
1860 deaths
19th-century American people
American male writers
Politicians from Boston
People from Ridgefield, Connecticut
Massachusetts state senators
Members of the Massachusetts House of Representatives
19th-century American politicians
People from Jamaica Plain